William Michael Wolfarth (30 June 1906 – 25 March 1993 in Miami, Florida) was a commissioner and mayor of Miami.

In 1936, he married Mary Agnes Galhouse (1912–1992) of Atlanta. They had 6 children and celebrated the renewal of their marriage vows in 1986 at Gesu Catholic Church.

Wolfarth grew up in Chicago and moved to Miami in 1934. In 1935, he opened the first of a chain of bakeries (Cushman Bakeries). From 1949-1951, he was the Mayor of the City of Miami and from 1951-1953 he served as a commissioner (his mother-in-law, Anne Galhouse, served as his secretary). He was responsible for building the original Art Deco main public Library in downtown Miami, which unfortunately was later torn down. In addition, he built the Morningside pool which still bears a plaque commemorating him. In 1959, he ran for mayor again against Robert King High on a platform to keep Miami segregated and lost the election.

References
 The Miami Herald; William Wolfarth Former Miami Mayor; 28 March 1993; Page 4B
 The St. Petersburg Times; Wolfarth Named New Miami Mayor, 23 November 1949.
 The Miami News; Mother-In-Law Secretary Rates Mayor Bill as Tops by Don Branning; 1 December 1949.

External links

1906 births
1993 deaths
Mayors of Miami
People from Chicago
20th-century American politicians
People from Joplin, Missouri